Deceptions is the first of the Special Edition copies in the Jedi Apprentice series which revolves around the story of young Obi-Wan Kenobi and Qui-Gon Jinn as Jedi prior to Star Wars: Episode I – The Phantom Menace.

Summary 
Family of former fellow student and rival to Obi-Wan Kenobi, Bruck Chun's father comes to Coruscant to investigate the events leading to Bruck's death. A trial commences to determine if there is need to have criminal charges brought against Obi-Wan. Meanwhile, the Jedi are having trouble with an experimental pilot program as their ships are constantly being sabotaged. Obi-Wan is eventually found innocent of any wrongdoing, and the saboteur is found to be a spy using a false identity provided by someone working in the senate but the saboteur escapes.

12 years later Obi-Wan and Anakin Skywalker are sent on their first mission together to determine if the citizens of a bioship are being brainwashed into staying there. They discover that the ship's leader is none other than Bruck Chun's brother. Bruck's father Vox is found to still be working for Offworld corporation (now under the name Broken Circle). Vox causes fake malfunctions in the ship so it will stop at certain planets which a short time later come under the thumb of Offworld. They discover a plot by vox to cause an evacuation of the ship so as to allow himself and Offworld to plunder the vast treasury of the bioship. His plan fails as his ally (the same saboteur from 12 years ago) steals the treasury for himself and shoots vox. Offworld ships open fire on the bioship and Anakin gets into a starfighter along with Jedi Knight Garen and they manage to fight off the attack.

External links
Official CargoBay Listing
TheForce.net review
Scholastic.com excerpt
Read the blurb of this book.

2001 novels
2001 science fiction novels
Deceptions
Star Wars Legends novels